"Things Can Only Get Better" was released as the first single from Howard Jones' 1985 album Dream into Action.

Background
A typically upbeat Jones composition, it was one of two songs from the album to feature all-female singing group Afrodiziak on backing vocals. John Leland from Spin magazine wrote that "It mines the best of the Anglo soul movement: a clean slap-bass line, precise horns and synths, and some well-paced and inviting singing".

The main B-side was another album track from the UK version of the album, "Why Look for the Key", although with a slightly longer fade that made it about twenty seconds longer than the version on the UK version of Dream into Action. "You Jazzy Nork!" is a reworked instrumental version of "Why Look for the Key" performed by the Alphonse Conway Orchestra.

The cover of the 12" single featured a photograph of Jones, in profile, sitting on a high bar stool. This image was used in silhouette for the 7" artwork, the single being issued in several alternative sleeves with different colour backgrounds.

Content

Jones said,

Music video
The video depicts Jones singing the song as his road crew sets up equipment for a concert, followed by a transition to the show as he performs for a lively crowd. It is intercut by Jones being interrupted in his dressing room by a dancing pastiche of Daniel from the 1984 film The Karate Kid, and the Tramp character made famous by Charlie Chaplin, both of whom appear in the crowd at the end.

Track listing

7" Elektra – 7-69651 (US)
 Things Can Only Get Better – 3:59
 Why Look for the Key – 3:40

12" Elektra – 0-66915 (US)
 Things Can Only Get Better (LP Version) -	3:59
 What Is Love? (New Extended Version) - 6:34
 Things Can Only Get Better (Extended Version) - 7:26
 New Song (New Version)  - 4:48

Both a 7" and 12" picture disc were released with the same tracks as the standard formats.

Remixes
In 2005, Swedish DJ Eric Prydz released a remixed version and renamed it "And Do You Feel Scared?". It is featured in the video game 2006 FIFA World Cup as one of the many EA Trax that appear in the game.

In 2013, French house music artist Cedric Gervais released a song featuring the vocal track from Howard Jones' original song. It too was titled "Things Can Only Get Better".

Chart history
"Things Can Only Get Better" reached number six in the UK Singles Chart and number five in the United States on the Billboard Hot 100 chart. The song also crossed over to the R&B charts in America, peaking at number 54.

Popular culture
This song was featured in episode 5 of the Watchmen TV series, in a short sequence set in 1985.

References

External links
The Official Howard Jones Website Discography

1985 singles
Howard Jones (English musician) songs
Songs written by Howard Jones (English musician)
1985 songs
Song recordings produced by Rupert Hine
Warner Music Group singles
Elektra Records singles